"Game Don't Wait" was the second single released from Warren G's third album, I Want It All. The remix of the song, which was the version released as a single was produced by Warren G's stepbrother Dr. Dre and featured fellow 213 members, Nate Dogg and Snoop Dogg, as well as Xzibit. It peaked at 58 on the Hot R&B/Hip-Hop Singles & Tracks. The original song was produced by Warren G and featured Snoop Dogg, Nate Dogg and Xzibit.

Single track listing
"Game Don't Wait" (Remix) (Clean)- 3:35
"Game Don't Wait" (Remix) (Album)- 3:47
"Game Don't Wait" (Remix) (Instrumental)- 3:33
"Game Don't Wait" (Remix) (A Cappella)- 3:04

B-Side
"Game Don't Wait" (Clean)- 4:16
"Game Don't Wait" (Album)- 4:15
"Game Don't Wait" (Instrumental)- 4:15
"Game Don't Wait" (A Cappella)- 4:15

Charts

Notes 

1999 singles
Warren G songs
Nate Dogg songs
Snoop Dogg songs
Xzibit songs
Song recordings produced by Dr. Dre
1999 songs
Restless Records singles
Songs written by Warren G
Songs written by Mack 10